Masuda is a city in Shimane Prefecture, Japan.

Masuda may also refer to:

Places
Masuda, Akita, a town in Akita Prefecture, Japan
Masuda Station, a railway station in Masuda, Shimane Prefecture

Other uses
Masuda (surname), a Japanese surname
Masuda Sultan (born 1978), an Afghan American human rights advocate
Masuda Funai, an American law firm
13654 Masuda, a main-belt minor planet

See also
 Matsuda